Dario Pieri (born September 1, 1975, in Florence) is an Italian former road bicycle racer.

Major results

1998
1st, Stage 1, Three Days of De Panne
1st, Stage 8, Tour de Langkawi
1999
1st, Stage 4, Tour of Slovenia
2000
2nd, Tour of Flanders
2002
1st, E3 Prijs Vlaanderen
2003
2nd, Paris–Roubaix
5th, Milan–San Remo

References

External links

 
Palmarès by cyclingbase.com 

1975 births
Italian male cyclists
Living people
Cyclists from Florence